State Route 232 (SR 232) is a state highway in Elko County, Nevada. It covers the majority of Clover Valley Road south of Wells.

Route description

From there, the route travels northward through the desert valley, somewhat paralleling U.S. Route 93 (US 93) to the east, as it traverses near the base of the East Humboldt Range. SR 232 serves a number of ranches and crosses several creeks as it treks northward through Clover Valley. After rounding the east side of Signal Hill, the highway turns eastward.

History
SR 232 was designated on July 1, 1976.

Major intersections

See also

References

232
Transportation in Elko County, Nevada